Palazzo Ghisilardi Fava is a Renaissance style palace, located on via Manzoni 4 in Bologna, region of Emilia Romagna, Italy; it houses the Medieval Civic Museum of Bologna.

Built for the notary and chancellor Bartolomeo Ghisilardi between 1484 and 1491 on designs of  Zilio Montanari. In the courtyard of the palace, rises the medieval tower called Torre dei Conoscenti. The name is derived because the house on the site was owned by the Conoscenti family in the 14th century. The tower was damaged in the earthquake of 1505. During the Mussolini era, the palaze housed the Casa del Fascio of Bologna. Across the street stands the church of the Madonna di Galliera.

Sources

Houses completed in 1491
Ghisilardi Fava
Renaissance architecture in Bologna